Drosophilist is a term used to refer to both the specific group of scientists trained in the laboratory of Thomas Hunt Morgan, and more generally any scientist who uses the vinegar fly  Drosophila melanogaster to study genetics, development, neurogenetics, behavior and a host of other subjects in animal biology. 

The core members of the original drosophilists at Columbia University included Morgan, Alfred Sturtevant, Calvin Bridges and Hermann Joseph Muller. Drosophilists directly connected with Morgan at Caltech included Theodosius Dobzhansky and George Beadle.

Drosophilists who have won Nobel Prizes
Nine drosophilists have won Nobel Prizes for their work in Drosophila:
Thomas Hunt Morgan – for his discovery that chromosomes contain linear arrangements of genes
Hermann Joseph Muller – for his discovery that X-rays can produce mutations
Christiane Nüsslein-Volhard – Shared with Wieschaus and Lewis "for their discoveries concerning the genetic control of early embryonic development"
Eric Wieschaus
Edward B. Lewis
Jules A. Hoffmann – "for discoveries concerning the activation of innate immunity"
Michael Rosbash - Shared with Young and Hall "for their discoveries of molecular mechanisms controlling the circadian rhythm"
Michael W. Young
Jeffrey C. Hall

A few other drosophilists won Nobel Prizes for work done in other systems:
George Wells Beadle – for work done with Neurospora crassa
Edward Lawrie Tatum – for work done with N. crassa
Richard Axel – for work on the mouse olfactory system

Other notable drosophilists
Walter Jakob Gehring
Michael Levine
William McGinnis
Seymour Benzer
Gero Miesenböck
Gerald M. Rubin
Allan C. Spradling
Andrea Brand
Norbert Perrimon
Huda Zoghbi
John Carlson
Leslie B. Vosshall
David Suzuki – a former drosophilist who became a notable science communicator
 Lily Jan and Yuh Nung Jan